Samantha Reeves (born January 17, 1979) is an American former professional tennis player.

Her best results in singles have been reaching the quarterfinals at Hawaii (2002), Bahia and Quebec City (2001).

WTA career finals

Doubles: 3 (2 titles, 1 runner-up)

ITF Circuit titles

Singles (2)

Doubles (6)

External links
 
 

1979 births
Living people
American female tennis players
People from Redwood City, California
Tennis people from California
21st-century American women